Martin Frank Gellert (born 1929) is a Czechoslovak-born American molecular biologist who is a past president of the American Society for Biochemistry and Molecular Biology.  He graduated from Harvard University in 1950 with an A.B. His doctorate was completed at Columbia University in 1956.
 
In 1985 he won the Richard Lounsbery Award jointly with Thomas Maniatis for "their seminal contributions to our understanding of the structure and function of DNA, which were essential and fundamental to the development of recombinant DNA techniques." Gellert is an NIH Distinguished Investigator at the National Institute of Diabetes and Digestive and Kidney Diseases (NIDDK).

References 

American molecular biologists
Scientists from Prague
Czechoslovak expatriates in the United States
Physicians of Dartmouth Medical School
Members of the United States National Academy of Sciences
Living people
1929 births
Harvard University alumni
Columbia University alumni
Richard-Lounsbery Award laureates